Nguyen Do (1959) is the pen name of Dos Nguyen, a Vietnamese American poet, editor, and translator.

Nguyen Do was born in Đông Thái village, Hà Tĩnh Province on December 16, 1959. After earning degrees in surveying from Hanoi Construction College and in literature from Vinh University, he taught at a high school in the city of Pleiku. He then lived for many years in Ho Chi Minh City, where he worked as an editor and reporter for a literary review and other newspapers and magazines, before moving to the United States to study English and journalism in 1999.

Nguyen has published thirteen books. His poetry collections include The Fish Wharf and The Autumn Evening (in collaboration with Thanh Thảo, Culture and Information Department of Gialai Kontum province, 1988), "The Empty Space" (The Publisher of Vietnamese Association Writers, 1991), and New Darkness (The Publisher of Vietnamese Association Writers, 2009.) With Paul Hoover, he edited and translated Black Dog, Black Night, an anthology of contemporary Vietnamese poetry (Milkweed Editions, 2008; eBooks, iBooks, nookBooks editions, 2011],Beyond the Court Gate Selected poetry of Nguyen Trai (Counterpath Press, 2010), 12+3 selected poetry of Thanh Thao, bilingual edition edited (Association Writers of Vietnam, 2008,) and Returning to Con Son Selected poetry of Nguyen Trai, bilingual edition edited and with photographs and poems in six-eight Vietnamese traditional version by poet Nguyen Duy (Saigon Culture Publisher, 2009.) He also edited and translated the poetry of Allen Ginsberg, Robert Frost, William Carlos Williams, and others into Vietnamese.

Nguyen's poetry and his translations have appeared in many anthologies including Litfinder (Cengage Learning,) and in poetry magazines around the United States and the world. In 2005, he received a grant from The Poetry Foundation of New York City “for his contribution to the poetry of the world”. In 2016 he was chosen one of the five best Southeast Asian poets. He lives in the San Francisco Bay region of California.

References

External links

http://media.sas.upenn.edu/pennsound/groups/XCP/XCP_223_Hoover_11-17-10.mp3

http://blog.semcoop.com/2010/07/05/beyond-the-court-gate-selected-poems-of-nguyen-trai/

http://m.thethaovanhoa.vn/van-hoa-giai-tri/nha-tho-nguyen-do-lan-dau-ve-tham-que-huong-nguyen-trai-n2010020309061156.htm

http://tuoitre.vn/Van-hoa-Giai-tri/Van-hoc/115525/Trong-tho-ca-loai-nguoi%C2%A0la-chung-toc-duy-nhat.html
https://vietcetera.com/en/notable-vietnamese-poets-today
 http://khoavanhoc-ngonngu.edu.vn/tin-tuc-noi-bat/2065-giao-lu-hc-thut-dch-th-nguyn-trai-hoa-k.html

Living people
1959 births
20th-century Vietnamese poets
Vietnamese translators
21st-century Vietnamese poets
Vietnamese male poets
People from Hà Tĩnh province
People from Hanoi
Vietnamese expatriates in the United States
20th-century male writers
21st-century male writers